June Fernández Casete (born 7 December 1984) is a Spanish journalist. She is a co-founder and the director of the feminist Pikara Magazine.

Life and work
Fernández was born in Bilbao in 1984. As a child she would interview her grandmother as part of her ambition to work for the newspaper El País. She graduated in journalism from the University of the Basque Country and then briefly lived in Nicaragua. She fulfilled her ambition when she started work for El País in 2006. Leaving there in 2009 she joined, and was till 2011, an advocate and publicist for SOS Racisme Biscay. Her support continued in 2020 when she spoke up in support of the end of xenophobia in the Basque country.

Pikara Magazine was founded in November 2010 by four journalists from the Equal Journalism Network: , Itziar Abad,  and Fernández.

She started blogging moving on to the alternative fortnightly newspaper Diagonal.

In 2020 she published Abrir el Melon, which translates as "Open the Melon". The book concerns a decade of female journalism. Fernandez has said that with respect to the title, she considers "melons tasty, sometimes bitter and addictive... and that she will open more".

In March 2022 she was amongst 151 international feminists signing Feminist Resistance Against War: A Manifesto, in solidarity with the Feminist Anti-War Resistance initiated by Russian feminists after the Russian invasion of Ukraine.

Personal life
In 2014, Fernandez was listed among   50 LGBT Spanish people of influence by Spanish LGBT blog Hay una Lesbiana en mi Sopa. She has a daughter.

Awards
She and Pikara Magazine have gained a number of awards. She wrote an article about intersexuality titled (in translation) "Will it be a boy or a girl?" and this won a journalism prize from the European Commission. The piece was linked with her interview with intersex and trans activist Mauro Cabral Grinspan and another interview with Spanish intersex psychologist Gabriel Martín.

In 2013 she wrote an article titled "“Yo quería sexo, pero no así” ("I Wanted Sex But Not Like That") that discussed when a "desired encounter turns into a sexual assault". She won a 2013 Colombine Award after it was published in Pikara Magazine and elDiario.es in November 2012. The judges welcomed that it was a subject not usually addressed in mainstream media. Victims of sexual assault can be confused by a mistaken "guilt". They can feel responsible, because they agreed to a date or they drank heavily, into thinking that a rape was their fault. Moreover the subject can be seen as taboo and the victim doesn't share and talk about what happened.

The Spanish Association of Women in the Media (Ameco) also gave her their Prensa-Mujer award for her contribution to increasing equality in 2013.

Works
 10 Ungovernables: Stories of Transgression and Rebellion
 Open the Melon, 2020

References

1984 births
Living people
21st-century Spanish women writers
Spanish lesbian writers
Spanish LGBT journalists
Lesbian journalists
People from Bilbao
Spanish feminists
Spanish feminist writers
Spanish women journalists
University of the Basque Country alumni